Men's team squads for the 1990 Dynasty Cup played in Beijing, China.

Group A

Head coach:  Gao Fengwen

Head coach:  Kenzo Yokoyama

Head coach:  Kim Jong-Min

Head coach:  Lee Cha-Man

References

External links
https://web.archive.org/web/20150225222428/http://rdfc.com.ne.kr/int/skor-intres-1990.html
http://www.rsssf.com/tablesj/jap-intres1990.html
https://web.archive.org/web/20150531023209/http://rdfc.com.ne.kr/int/china-intres-1990.html

1990 in Asian football